The South Texas Medical Center (STMC) or Bexar County Hospital District consists of  of medical-related facilities on the northwest side of San Antonio, Texas, United States.

STMC, which directly serves 38 counties, consists of forty-five medically related institutions; separate medical, dental and nursing schools, five higher educational institutions, twelve hospitals and five specialty institutions.  These facilities combined currently total over 4,200 patient beds.

In 2009, STMC was home to more than $350 million in construction projects. More than $1 billion in new construction projects are currently planned through 2014.

Staff and budget

In 2009, 27,884 persons were directly employed at the center, and the combined budget of all entities at the South Texas Medical Center totaled $3.3 billion. STMC is the San Antonio area's second largest employer.

Research and development

San Antonio's Biosciences industry employs over 100,000 people. The largest areas of research are conducted by institutes in or around the South Texas Medical Center. These include the oncology division of one of the world's top five biotechnology firms, the world's largest Phase I clinical trials program for new anti-cancer drugs, and the new $200 million Children's Cancer Research Institute. San Antonio also houses the world's largest genomics computing cluster and the state's public bank for stem cell-rich umbilical cord blood.

Academics
Central to the medical center is the University of Texas Health Science Center at San Antonio and its teaching hospital: The University Hospital, which is the source of employment for 12,000 people. The Audie Murphy VA Hospital, CTRC, Brooke Army Medical Center, Texas Cancer Clinic, the Children's Cancer Research Institute, Christus Santa Rosa health system, Texas Neuroscience Institute, Villa Rosa, St Luke, and 11 Methodist hospitals also have affiliated programs or projects with the UT Health Science Center.

The University of the Incarnate Word also has a campus located in the eastern part of the South Texas Medical Center, where its optometry school is located. UIW has affiliated programs with the Christus Santa Rosa health system.

San Antonio College has a nursing training program at STMC, and the University of Texas at San Antonio has joint programs with UTHSCSA's GSBS and School of Allied Health Sciences.

The Baptist Health System School of Health Professions is also located in the South Texas Medical Center.

The University of Texas at Austin's School of Pharmacy also has research facilities and staff located in the medical center.

Also situated in the South Texas Medical Center is Health Careers High School, a health professions-based magnet school of Northside ISD that enrolls just under 1,000 students from around Bexar County.

Gallery

Member institutions

Member institutions with facilities and offices in the Center are:

See also
 Southwest Research Institute
 Southwestern Medical District
 Southwest Foundation for Biomedical Research
 Texas Medical Center
 University of Texas Southwestern Medical Center

References

External sources

 South Texas Medical Center
 San Antonio Medical Foundation's listing and extended listing